Fedosov is a Russian masculine surname, its feminine counterpart is Fedosova. It may refer to
Albert Fedosov (born 1970), Russian football player
Genrikh Fedosov (1932–2005), Russian football player
Pavlo Fedosov (born 1996), Ukrainian football player
Tamara Safonova (née Fedosova in 1946), Russian diver

See also
Fedosov manifold

Russian-language surnames